Raimondiceras Upper Jurassic ammonite belonging to the ammonitida family.

Distribution 
Jurassic deposits in Antarctica and Colombia

References
Notes

Jurassic ammonites
Ammonitida genera